CAFFE stands for Coordinating Anthropological Film Festivals in Europe. It is an initiative geared towards better cooperation and communication between the existing anthropological film festivals in Europe.

There are now courses in, and even centres of visual anthropology at several universities in Europe. An increasing number of students are 
enrolling in these courses, even short-term courses that merely scratch the 
surface of either visual anthropology or ethnographic filmmaking. 
Most importantly is the fact that we now have an abundance of film 
festivals in Europe that are linked to the fields of visual anthropology, 
visual culture, ethnographic film, and other forms of audio-visual 
media.  
Each event has its own features and foci, reflecting both trends in the 
academic environments from which they emanate, as well as the 
cultural diversity of the globalised world that surrounds them.

Currently CAFFE network brings together seventeen anthropological and ethnographic film festivals

Members of CAFFE 
 Astra Film (Sibiu, Romania)
 Beeld Voor Beeld (Amsterdam, The Netherlands)
 Days of Ethnographic Cinema (Moscow, Russia)
 Days of Ethnographic Film (Ljubljana, Slovenia)
 Dialëektus Fesztivál (Budapest, Hungary)
 Ethnocineca (Vienna, Austria)
 Festival International Jean Rouch (Paris, France)
 Festival of Visual Anthropology (Toruń, Poland)
 Freiburger Film Forum (Freiburg, Germany)
 Göttingen International Ethnographic Film Festival (Göttingen, Germany)
 International Festival of Ethnological Film (Belgrade, Serbia)
 Moscow International Visual Anthropology Festival (Moscow, Russia)
 NAFA International Nordic Anthropological Film Association Conference/Festival]
 RAI International Festival of Ethnographic Film (Leeds, United Kingdom)
 SIEFF Sardinia International Ethnographic Film Festival (Sardinia, Italy)
 VISCULT – Festival of Visual Culture (Joensuu, Finland)
 WORLDFILM Tartu Festival of Visual Culture (Tartu, Estonia)

Bibliography
Aida Vallejo e María-Paz Peirano (a cura di), Film Festivals and Anthropology, Cambridge Scholars Publishing, 2018,

See also 
Ethnographic film
Visual anthropology
Ethnofiction
American Anthropological Association

References

See also
 Visual Anthropology  – Encyclopedia of Cultural Anthropology, article by Jay Ruby

External links 
 Visual Anthropology Network of the European Association of Social Anthropologists website

Documentary film organizations
Visual anthropology